Alan Charles Cope (born 17 July 1988) is an English cricketer. Cope is a right-handed batsman who bowls right-arm medium pace. He was born in Guildford, Surrey and was educated at Cranleigh School.

While studying for his degree at Loughborough University, Cope made his first-class debut for Loughborough UCCE against Warwickshire in 2008. Injuries hampered Cope, with him missing the entire 2009 season. Returning from injury for the 2010 season, he was named captain of Loughborough MCCU (as it was now called following a renaming). He made two further first-class appearances in 2010, against Kent and Yorkshire. In his three first-class matches, he scored 84 runs at an average of 16.80, with a high score of 51.

Alan now focuses his sporting attention on golf. He is a bandit and should be playing off a far lower handicap.

References

External links
Alan Cope at ESPNcricinfo
Alan Cope at CricketArchive

1988 births
Living people
Sportspeople from Guildford
People educated at Cranleigh School
Alumni of Loughborough University
English cricketers
Loughborough MCCU cricketers